Oleyl alcohol , or cis-9-octadecen-1-ol, is an unsaturated fatty alcohol with the molecular formula  or the condensed structural formula .  It is a colorless oil, mainly used in cosmetics.

It can be produced by the hydrogenation of oleic acid esters by Bouveault–Blanc reduction, which avoids reduction of the C=C group (as would occur with usual catalytic hydrogenation). The required oleate esters are obtained from beef fat, fish oil, and, in particular, olive oil (from which it gains its name).   The original procedure was reported by Louis Bouveault in 1904 and subsequently refined.

It has uses as a nonionic surfactant, emulsifier, emollient and thickener in skin creams, lotions and many other cosmetic products including shampoos and hair conditioners. It has also been investigated as a carrier for delivering medications through the skin or mucus membranes; particularly the lungs.

See also
 Oleic acid - the corresponding fatty acid
 Oleylamine - the corresponding amine
 Oleamide - the corresponding amide

References

Fatty alcohols
Non-ionic surfactants
Cosmetics chemicals
Alkenols